Craig Peter Halkett (born 29 May 1995) is a Scottish footballer who plays as defender for Scottish Premiership club Heart of Midlothian.

Initially a striker in his youth, Halkett joined Glasgow Rangers F.C.(1872). At age 14 before being moved to defensive roles and being loaned out to Scottish League Two clubs Clyde and Berwick Rangers. After being released by Rangers, Halkett spent several years at Livingston, making over 100 appearances, before signing a contract with Heart of Midlothian in 2019.

Club career

Rangers 
Raised in Kirkintilloch and a boyhood Rangers fan, Halkett joined the club as a youngster. Initially playing as a striker, he was moved into more defensive roles by youth coach Alan Kernaghan. After winning the Scottish Youth Cup in 2014, he was loaned out twice, to Clyde and Berwick Rangers, both playing in the fourth tier.

Livingston 
In January 2016, Halkett was informed by Rangers that there was no immediate prospect of him progressing to the first team and he left the Ibrox club without having made a senior appearance, joining then Scottish Championship side Livingston. He scored his first professional goal against Rangers in a 1–0 win for Livingston on 26 April 2016.

The Lions were relegated from the Championship at the end of his first campaign in a play-off, but Halkett became an increasingly important player for the West Lothian side, helping them to immediately return from League One in 2016–17, followed by a second consecutive promotion to the Scottish Premiership after finishing runners-up in the regular season, once more via the play-offs.

Halkett was made club captain, and was an important part of Livingston's 2018–19 season, with the team's defence gaining much praise with the relatively few number of goals conceded compared to similarly-placed teams in the league.

Hearts 
In April 2019, Halkett signed a pre-contract agreement with Hearts. He suffered a knee injury in October 2019, and it was announced he would be out for 10 weeks.

On 11 January 2022, Halkett signed a new two-and-a-half year contract with Hearts, keeping him at the club until the end of the 2023–24 season.

International career
Halkett represented Scotland once, at under-19 level in 2014. He received his first call-up to the senior Scotland squad in March 2022.

Career statistics

Honours
Rangers Academy
Scottish Youth Cup: 2013–14

Livingston
Scottish League One: 2016–17

Heart of Midlothian
Scottish Championship: 2020–21
Scottish Cup: Runner-up 2019–20

Individual
PFA Scotland Team of the Year: 2018–19 Scottish Premiership

References

External links

1995 births
Living people
Scottish footballers
People educated at Kirkintilloch High School
Sportspeople from Kirkintilloch
Association football defenders
Rangers F.C. players
Berwick Rangers F.C. players
Livingston F.C. players
Scottish Professional Football League players
Clyde F.C. players
Scotland youth international footballers
Heart of Midlothian F.C. players